The list of Anglican churches in Hong Kong is as follows:

Diocese of Hong Kong Island

Parishes 
 Holy Nativity Church
 St. Peter's Church, North Point
 St. Mary's Church
 St. James' Church
 St. John's Cathedral
 St. Paul's Church
 St. Matthew's Church
 St. Stephen's Church
 St. Luke's Church

Missions 
 St. Timothy's Church
 Grace Church
 Church of the Incarnation
 Church of the Ascension
 Discovery Bay Church
 St. Stephen's Chapel
 Emmanuel Church

Diocese of Eastern Kowloon

Parishes 
 Holy Trinity Cathedral
 Christ Church
 Holy Carpenter Church
 Church of the Good Shepherd
 St. Mark's Church
 Calvary Church
 St. Barnabas' Church
 Kindly Light Church
 Holy Spirit Church
 Church of St. John the Baptist
 Church of the Holy Word

Missions 
 Church of Our Saviour
 St. Titus' Church
 Holy Wisdom Church
 Resurrection Church
 Shatin Anglican Church
 The Church of The Magnificat
 Kei Lok Church
 Church of the Transfiguration
 St. Augustine's Chapel

Diocese of Western Kowloon

Parishes 
 All Saints' Cathedral
 St. Andrew's Church
 St. Thomas' Church
 Kei Oi Church
 St. Matthias' Church
 St. Peter's Church, Castle Peak
 Crown of Thorns Church
 St. Joseph's Church
 St. Philip's Church
 The Church of the Epiphany

Missions 
 The Church of Shalom
 Church of the Divine Love

See also 

 Diocese of Hong Kong Island
 Diocese of Eastern Kowloon
 Diocese of Western Kowloon
 Religion in Hong Kong
 Hong Kong Sheng Kung Hui
 List of Anglican churches in Macau
 List of Anglican churches
 Anglican Communion

References

External links 
 Hong Kong Sheng Kung Hui
 Diocese of Hong Kong Island 
 Diocese of Eastern Kowloon
 Diocese of Western Kowloon
 Hong Kong (Anglicans Online)

Hong Kong Sheng Kung Hui
Hong Kong, Anglican
Churches in Hong Kong
Lists of religious buildings and structures in Hong Kong